The 2010–11 North Superleague was the tenth staging of the North Superleague, the highest tier of league competition in the North Region of the Scottish Junior Football Association. The season began on 2 August 2010. Sunnybank were the reigning champions. The winners of this competition gain direct entry to round one of the 2011–12 Scottish Cup.

Table

Results

Superleague promotion/relegation play-off

Longside retain their place in the SJFA North Superleague for the 2011–12 season.

References

6
SJFA North Region Superleague seasons